Gundaroo is a small village in the Southern Tablelands of New South Wales, Australia and in Yass Valley Council.

History
The area now known as Gundaroo lies close to the boundaries of the traditional lands of the Gandangara and Ngunawal peoples. The Gandangara and Ngunawal peoples spoke closely related, if not identical, languages.

The explorers Charles Throsby and Joseph Wild traveled through the Yass River valley in 1820. The Aboriginal people called the valley Candariro, meaning "blue crane". This name may have been the origin of Gundaroo, or it may mean "big waterhole". Governor Lachlan Macquarie granted the first white settler, Peter Cooney,  in 1825. Settlement proceeded fairly quickly and there were about 400 residents in the 1840s. The first non-residential building in Gundaroo was the Harrow Inn, built in 1834. The plan of the town made by James Larmer was gazetted in 1847. A post office was built in 1848 and an Anglican church, St Luke's in Upper Gundaroo (now part of a pottery business), in 1849. The first school opened in 1850 and a police station in 1852.  A major impetus for the growth in the middle of the nineteenth century was the discovery of gold in the district in 1852. There was another short-lived phase of reef gold mining in the district in the 1890s.

Gundaroo was one of the sites considered for a capital city, within the 'Yass-Canberra' district. However, following a survey of the various sites, by Charles Scrivener, in 1909, Canberra was selected as the site for the new national capital city.

World War II air crash
On 7 December 1943, a RAAF Lockheed Ventura crashed three miles south-east of Gundaroo, killing all five crew members. A memorial to the victims was erected in the town.

Gallery

Notable people
 William Affleck (1836–1923), a Scottish-born Australian politician. 
 John Forrester-Clack, an Australian artist
 Jack Clemenger (1899–1964), an Australian tennis player
 Charles Elliott (1870-1938), an Australian politician
 Les Haylen (1898–1977), an Australian politician, playwright, novelist and journalist
 Maud Jeffries (1869–1946), an American actress
 Dick Smith (born 1944), an Australian entrepreneur, aviator, philanthropist and political activist

References

External links

Towns in New South Wales
Southern Tablelands
Yass Valley Council
Mining towns in New South Wales
Proposed sites for national capital of Australia